Emergency Flotation Systems (EFS) are emergency systems installed on larger commercial and military helicopters in order to prevent the airframe sinking in the event of a crash landing on water. The floats may be packed within spaces inside the airframe or as externally mounted packs on the helicopter skids. The floats are inflated using gas stored in pressurised cylinders carried on board the helicopter.

History

By 1979, United States Navy and Marine Corps Boeing Vertol CH-46 Sea Knight helicopters had been involved in 64 emergency landings in water. Of the 64, 47 helicopters sunk after landing, killing 75. A study estimated 50% of those fatalities could have been prevented had the helicopters been equipped with adequate emergency flotation. Because helicopters tend to have a high center of gravity due to the high-mounted engine and transmission, even if they are naturally buoyant in the water with hatches secured, they will tend to overturn in heavy sea conditions.

Regulation
In the United States, regulations for ditching aircraft are included in Federal Aviation Regulations Parts 27 and 29, and specific guidance is provided in Advisory circulars 27-1B and 29-2C.

Design
The most rapid inflation is provided by pressurised helium although some float systems use helium blended with other gases such as nitrogen to slow down the inflation rate.

References

External links
  Zodiac Group: AERAZUR (Cognac, France) and Air Cruisers Company (Wall Township, New Jersey, USA) are two major manufacturing sources for emergency flotation systems requirements. rde09jun09.
 
 
 
 
 
 

Helicopter components